Pica is the genus of seven species of birds in the family Corvidae in both the New World and the Old.

Pica have long tails and have predominantly black and white markings. For instance, one species travels throughout Europe to Asia, one lives in western North America, one stays within California, one is confined to southwestern Saudi Arabia, and another one comes from North Africa. The last two species are often considered subspecies of the Eurasian. They were previously considered closely related to the blue and green magpies of Asia, but research suggests their closest relatives are the Eurasian crows.

Taxonomy
The genus Pica was introduced by the French zoologist Mathurin Jacques Brisson in 1760. He derived the name by tautonymy from the specific epithet of the Eurasian magpie Corvus pica which was introduced by Linnaeus in 1758.  Pica is the Latin word for the Eurasian magpie.

In 2018, a molecular phylogenetic study found that the Eurasian magpie consisted of multiple species including the Maghreb magpie, the Asir magpie, the black-rumped magpie and the oriental magpie.

Species
The genus contains seven living species:

Fossil species

Two prehistoric species of Pica are currently known: Pica mourerae, from fossils found in Pliocene–Pleistocene boundary strata on Mallorca, and Pica praepica, from Early Pleistocene strata of Bulgaria.

References

 
Bird genera
Taxa named by Mathurin Jacques Brisson